Holger Rune defeated the defending champion Novak Djokovic in the final, 3–6, 6–3, 7–5 to win the singles tennis title at the 2022 Paris Masters. It was his maiden Masters 1000 title, and he saved three match points en route, in the first round against Stan Wawrinka. Rune made his top-10 debut in the ATP rankings with the win, and he defeated five top-10 players en route to the title. This was Rune's fourth final in a row, and his third title. He became the second teenager to win a Masters 1000 title in the 2022 season, after Carlos Alcaraz at Miami and Madrid. Rune was the first Scandinavian to win a Masters 1000 title since Robin Söderling at the 2010 Paris Masters.

This tournament marked the final professional appearance of former world No. 6 Gilles Simon; he lost in the third round to Félix Auger-Aliassime.

Auger-Aliassime was attempting to win his fourth tournament in as many weeks, but lost in the semifinals to Rune in a rematch of the Swiss Indoors final from the previous week, snapping his winning streak at 16 matches.

Rafael Nadal and Alcaraz were both in contention for the ATP No. 1 singles ranking at the beginning of the tournament. Following Nadal's second round loss to Tommy Paul, Alcaraz retained the No. 1 ranking.

Seeds
The top eight seeds received a bye into the second round.

Draw

Finals

Top half

Section 1

Section 2

Bottom half

Section 3

Section 4

Qualifying

Seeds

Qualifiers

Lucky loser

Draw

First qualifier

Second qualifier

Third qualifier

Fourth qualifier

Fifth qualifier

Sixth qualifier

Seventh qualifier

References

External links
Main draw
Qualifying draw

Singles